Akenomyces is a fungal genus in the class Agaricomycetes. It has not yet been placed in any order or family. A monotypic genus, it contains the single anamorphic species Akenomyces costatus. The generic name is derived from the Latin achene, "small dry fruit".

References

External links

Agaricomycetes
Monotypic Basidiomycota genera